Charles Chauvel may refer to:
 Charles Chauvel (filmmaker) (1897–1959), Australian filmmaker
 Charles Chauvel (politician) (born 1969), New Zealand politician